Lata Mangeshkar (born as Hema Mangeshkar; 28 September 1929 – 6 February 2022) was an Indian playback singer, music director and music producer who made Bollywood music. This is a list of awards and nominations received by Mangeshkar in her such long career.

Government of India Awards
 1969 - Padma Bhushan
 1989 - Dadasaheb Phalke Award
 1999 - Padma Vibhushan
 2001 - Bharat Ratna
 2008 - "One Time Award for Lifetime Achievement" honour to commemorate the 60th anniversary of India's Independence

Maharashtra State Film Awards
 1966 - Best Playback Singer for Sadhi Mansa
 1966 - Best Music Director for Sadhi Mansa (Marathi) under the name 'Anandghan'
 1977 - Best Playback Singer for Jait Re Jait
 1997 - Maharashtra Bhushan Award
 2001 - Maharashtra Ratna (First Recipient)

National Film Awards
Lata Mangeshkar holds the record of being the oldest winner at the age of 61 of this award. She received her recent award in this category for the songs of film Lekin.... The jury presented her this award "for singing with outstanding expressions with the rarest and purest of styles."

 1972 - Best Female Playback Singer for songs of the film Parichay
 1974 - Best Female Playback Singer for songs of the film Kora Kagaz
 1990 - Best Female Playback Singer for songs of the film Lekin...

Filmfare Awards
The Filmfare Awards for playback singing first started in 1959. In 1956, the song "Rasik Balma" from the film Chori Chori by Shankar-Jaikishan won the Best Song Filmfare Award. Lata refused to sing it live in protest of absence of a Playback Singer category. The category was finally introduced in 1959. Though, separate awards for male & female singers were introduced later on. Lata Mangeshkar monopolized the best female playback singer award from 1959 to 1967. In 1970, Lata made the unusual gesture of giving up Filmfare awards in order to promote fresh talent.
 1959 - "Aaja Re Pardesi" from Madhumati
 1963 - "Kahi Deep Jale Kahi Dil" from Bees Saal Baad
 1966 - "Tumhi Mere Mandir Tumhi Meri Pooja" from Khandan
 1970 - "Aap Mujhe Achhe Lagne Lage" from Jeene Ki Raah
 1993 - Filmfare Lifetime Achievement Award
 1994 - Filmfare Special Award for "Didi Tera Devar Deewana" from Hum Aapke Hain Koun..!
 2004 - Filmfare Special Award where a golden trophy was presented on the occasion of Filmfare Awards completing 50 years

Bengal Film Journalists' Association Awards
All Best Female Playback Singer
 1964 - for Woh Kaun Thi?
 1967 - for Milan
 1968 - for Raja Aur Runk
 1969 - for Saraswatichandra
 1970 - for Do Raaste
 1971 - for Tere Mere Sapne
 1972 - for Pakeezah
 1973 - for Bon Palashir Padabali (Bengali film)
 1973 - for Abhimaan
 1975 - for Kora Kagaz
 1981 - for Ek Duuje Ke Liye
 1983 - for A Portrait Of Lataji
 1985 - for Ram Teri Ganga Maili
 1987 - for Amarsangee (Bengali film)
 1991 - for Lekin...

Doctor of Letters
 Maharaja Sayajirao University of Baroda (2005)
 Shivaji University, Kolhapur, India
 Pune University, India
 Indira Kala Sangeet Vishwavidyalaya, Khairagarh, India
 Fellow at Sangeet Natak Akademi in 1989
 Hyderabad University, India
 New York University
 Baroda University

Other awards and honours
 1974 - Recorded in the Guinness Book of World Records for having sung the maximum number of songs in the world
 1980 - Presented key of the city of Georgetown, Guyana, South America
 1980 - Honorary Citizenship of The Republic of Surinam, South America
 1985 - 9 June, declared as Asia Day in honour of her arrival in Toronto, Ontario, Canada
 1987 - Honorary Citizenship of United States in Houston, Texas
 1990 - Raja-Lakshmi Award by Sri Raja-Lakshmi Foundation, Chennai
 1996 - Screen Award for Best Female Playback Singer for Hum Aapke Hain Koun..!
 1996 - Rajiv Gandhi National Sadbhavana Award
 1996 - Star Screen Lifetime Achievement Award
 1997 - Rajiv Gandhi Award
 1998 - Lifetime Achievement Award by the South Indian Educational Society 
 1999 - NTR National Award
 1999 - Zee Cine Award for Lifetime Achievement
 1999 - Zee Cine Award for Best Female Playback Singer for "Dil To Pagal Hai"
 2000 - IIFA Lifetime Achievement Award
 2000 - Jeevan Gaurav Puraskar by the Chaturang Pratishthan
 2001 - Best Playback Singer of the Millennium (Female) by Hero Honda and file magazine "Stardust"
 2001 - Noor Jehan Award (First Recipient)
 2002 - Sahyadri Navratna Award for 'Swar Ratna' of the year.
 2002 - Felicitation By CII (For Contribution to Music & the Film Industry)
 2002 - Hakim Khan Sur Award (For National Integration by Maharana Mewar Foundation)
 2002 - Asha Bhosle Award (First Recipient)
 2004 - Living Legend Award by the Federation of Indian Chamber of Commerce and Industry (FICCI).
 2005 - Legend Honour by Sahara One Sangeet Awards 
 2006 - Life Achievement Award by Merrill Lynch investment managers and Adora (India's second largest diamond exporter)
 2007 - Forever Indian Award
 2007 - Uttam Vaggayekar Jialal Vasant Award
 2009 - ANR National Award
 2010 - Knight of the Legion of Honour (French highest civilian award)
 2010 - "Pride of India - Kala Saraswathi" Music Award. 
 2010 - Bhojpuri Film Award for Best Female Playback Singer for Umaria Kaili Tohre Naam
 2010 - Big Marathi Music Award for Lifetime Achievement (Best Playback Singer)
 2010 - GIMA Award for Lifetime Achievement.
 2010 - GIMA Award for Best Devotional Album for "Shree Hanuman Chalisa".
 2011 - Swarbhaskar Awards by Pune Municipal Corporation (First Recipient)
 2011 - Sri Chanrasekarendra Saraswathi National Eminence Award.

 2011 - Swaralaya Yesudas Legendary Award
 2011 - Pazhassi Raja award 2011's Sangeetha Ratna Award
 2018 - Swara Mauli award, Swara Mauli title by spiritual guru Vidya Narsimha Bharati Swami

2020 - Only Singer Ranked all-India 23rd in TRA's Most Desired Personality list 2020
2023 - Rolling Stone magazine's list of "The 200 Greatest Singers of All Time" places him at number 84.
 Year unknown
 "Avadh Samman" by the Government of Uttar Pradesh.
 "Swar Bharati" award given by Shankaracharya of Sankeshwar
 The only Asian to have received the Platinum Disc of EMI London
 Conferred the title of Asthaan Sangeet Vidwaan Sarloo ("Court Musician of the Shrine"), Tirupathi.
 Member of the Rajya Sabha

Apart from the above, Lata has received about 250 trophies and 150 gold discs.

References

Lists of Indian award winners
Mangeshkar, Lata
Lata Mangeshkar